"Figure 8" is a song by English singer and songwriter Ellie Goulding from her second studio album, Halcyon (2012). It was released on 14 December 2012 as the album's second single. The song was written by Goulding and Jonny Lattimer and produced by Monsta, with additional production by Mike Spencer. The accompanying music video was directed by W.I.Z. and released on 19 November 2012.

Critical reception
"Figure 8" received mostly positive reviews from music critics. Michael Roffman of Time called it "a defensive track that finds [Goulding] reasoning with her scorched paths", adding that Spencer's work with Jamiroquai or Kylie Minogue "injects a scenic quality that bludgeons with cinematic density." Digital Spys Lewis Corner noted the song "continues to explore Ellie's ascent into womanhood, centering around her experience of being left heartbroken by a former love over a buzzing dubstep bassline that vibrates with a gentle nod to the album's namesake."

Sam Lansky of Idolator opined that "Figure 8" "gives the obligatory concession to dubstep, with production by MONSTA serving as effectively, if not more so, than [...] Skrillex himself would have done." Scott Shetler of PopCrush wrote, "Built around piano and electronics, 'Figure 8' has a moody vibe that matches its heartbreaking lyrics", while comparing it to Alex Clare's "Too Close", a song co-produced by Spencer. However, in a review of Halcyon, BBC Music's Ben Hewitt expressed, "Far from showing off her talents, the likes of 'Figure 8' and 'Atlantis' become bottomless pits filled with heavy-handed knob-twiddling."

Commercial performance
"Figure 8" debuted at number 121 on the UK Singles Chart dated 8 December 2012, ahead of its single release, entering the top 100 at number 82 the following week. After jumping to number 49, the single peaked at number 33 in its fourth week on the chart. The song fared better in New Zealand, where it peaked at number seven, her highest-charting single in that country at that point, and was later certified platinum by Recorded Music NZ. "Figure 8" became Goulding's first song to chart in Finland, reaching number eight.

Music video
The music video for "Figure 8", directed by W.I.Z., was filmed in a mansion outside London, and features freerunner Tim Shieff. The video premiered on 19 November 2012. Switching constantly between black-and-white and coloured shots, the video reflects on breaking up with an ex and then missing them. It consists of intercut scenes of Goulding in the mansion in several different situations, such as lying on a mattress as she clutches a red piece of cloth, lying in bed with her on-screen boyfriend, dressed in a red, flowing gown while covered in a red veil, blindfolded, and breaking dishes. Towards the end of the video, Goulding's lit-up body is shown levitating off the bed, as she lets go of the red cloth.

Track listing

Credits and personnel
Credits adapted from the liner notes of Halcyon.

 Ellie Goulding – vocals
 Rufio Sandilands – arrangement, all instruments
 Rocky Morris – arrangement, all instruments
 Monsta – production, additional vocal production, recording
 Mike Spencer – additional production, mix, additional vocal production, all instruments, recording
 Jonny Lattimer – vocal production
 Naweed – mastering

Charts

Weekly charts

Year-end charts

Certifications

Release history

References

2012 singles
2012 songs
Ellie Goulding songs
Polydor Records singles
Songs written by Ellie Goulding
Songs written by Jonny Lattimer